Cross Movement Records is an American-based Christian hip hop record label founded by The Cross Movement. 

CMR, founded in 1997, had an agreement with BEC Recordings. In 2005 they made a license agreement with Reach Records' Lecrae. CMR was to release his first three solo albums. Hence solidifying the label's span of music, including Da' T.R.U.T.H. and the Cross Movement for the East Coast, and the Midwest with the artists FLAME and J.R. 

In 2006 a new imprint was made, Issachar Recordings, meant to release albums with different musical styles than hip hop. The first album of the label was Michelle Bonilla's R&B album: "Phenomenal" (2006).

In 2007, the hip-hop duo Everyday Process was added to the CMR roster as well as Rhyme Council artist, R-Swift. In 2010 CMR signed K-Drama, Philadelphia artist Young Joshua, and DJ group Level 3:16.

Artists 

 The Tonic – John Wells
 Phanatik – Brady Goodwin Jr.
 The Cross Movement (disbanded in 2007)
 Lecrae (Was licensed and now with Reach Records)
 Da' T.R.U.T.H. – Emanuel Lambert
 The Ambassador – William Branch
 DJ Official (was with Reach Records, deceased)
 Everyday Process
 Michelle Bonilla
 K-Drama
 Young Joshua
 6 Way St. (FKA Level 3:16)
 FLAME – Marcus Gray (Active, signed to and owns Clear Sight Music)
 J.R.
 R-Swift (also with Rhyme Council)
 Cruz Cordero
 Enoch (also with Much Luv Fam) (deceased)

References

External links
 

 
American record labels
Christian hip hop record labels
Record labels established in 1997